Cavacoa is a plant genus of the family Euphorbiaceae first described as a genus in 1955. All the species are native to sub-Saharan Africa. It is dioecious.

Species
 Cavacoa aurea (Cavaco) J.Léonard - Kenya, Malawi, Mozambique, KwaZulu-Natal
 Cavacoa baldwinii (Keay & Cavaco) J.Léonard - Sierra Leone, Liberia
 Cavacoa quintasii (Pax & K.Hoffm.) J.Léonard - Annobón, São Tomé, Zaïre

References

Aleuritideae
Euphorbiaceae genera
Flora of Africa
Dioecious plants